Francesco Jacovacci (1840 — 1908) was an Italian painter, often painting historical canvases and costume genre pieces.

Jacovacci was born in Rome. He was a pupil of Alessandro Capalti and Alessandro Marini. He collaborated with Cesare Fracassini in completing the frescoes for the church of San Lorenzo fuori le Mura. His paintings were often sold through the Goupil gallery.

Jacovacci won an award at 1880 Turin National Exposition with his painting of Michelangelo davanti dalla salma di Vittoria Colonna (Michelangelo before the body of his mistress Vittoria Colonna), currently held by the Capodimonte Museum, Naples. Among Jacovacci's other works are The Gondola (1876).

Jacovacci died in Rome in 1908.

Gallery

References

1840 births
1908 deaths
19th-century Italian painters
19th-century Italian male artists
Italian male painters
20th-century Italian painters
20th-century Italian male artists
Italian costume genre painters